Moneilema armatum is a species of flat-faced longhorn in the family of beetles known as Cerambycidae. It is found in the southwestern United States and northern Mexico. The flightless beetles often feed on prickly pear cactus, boring into the stems and roots.

References

Further reading

External links

 

Moneilemini
Beetles described in 1853